The London Saturday Journal was a general interest magazine publishing short fiction and nonfiction pieces. Established in 1839, it was published in London, England in the Victorian era. The magazine was published by William Smith. During its existence the magazine had four volumes the last of which was issued in 1842.

References

London Saturday Journal archive at HathiTrust

1839 establishments in England
1842 disestablishments in England
Defunct literary magazines published in the United Kingdom
Magazines published in London
Magazines established in 1839
Magazines disestablished in 1842